Bruce Best is an Australian director and producer known for his long association with A Country Practice. He was also one of the first people to cast Cate Blanchett, putting her in the show Heartland.

Select Credits
A Country Practice - director
Family and Friends - producer
G.P. - producer
Pacific Drive - producer
Queen of the Road - director

References

External links

Bruce Best at Screen Australia

Australian television directors
Living people
Year of birth missing (living people)